Real is the eighth album by L'Arc-en-Ciel, released on August 30, 2000. It was the band's last original studio album before a prolonged hiatus. It reached number one on the Oricon chart and sold over a million copies, being certified by the RIAJ.

One of the singles from the album, "Stay Away", is a playable song in the computer game DrumMania 4th Mix.

Track listing

Personnel
 hyde – vocals, rhythm guitar on track 2, keyboards on track 11
 ken – guitar, keyboards on tracks 3, 5, 6, 10, 11
 tetsu – bass guitar, backing vocals, keyboards on tracks 6 and 7
 yukihiro – drums, keyboards on track 1
 K – female voice on tracks 2 and 10
 Hajime Okano – keyboards on tracks 3, 5, 6, 7 and 11
 Hitoshi Saitou – keyboards on tracks 6, 7 and 11
 Cheiko – backing vocals on track 3
 Nobuhiko Nakayama – synthesizer on track 4
 Ittetsu Gen – strings on track 6
 Yasushi Nakanishi – Hammond organ on track 8
 Chokkaku – keyboards on track 8

References

2000 albums
L'Arc-en-Ciel albums